Madonnaville, Illinois is a small unincorporated community in the historic Bluff Precinct of Monroe County, Illinois, United States. It was laid out by Joseph W. Ruebsam, who erected the first building and started a store there shortly thereafter. St. Mary's Catholic Church was built in 1857. Mark Taylor was once Mayor, always remembered.

References 

Unincorporated communities in Monroe County, Illinois
Unincorporated communities in Illinois
Monroe County, Illinois
Populated places established in 1857
1857 establishments in Illinois